Sulek may refer to:
 Sulek (surname)
 Sülek, Bartın, a village in Bartın Province, Turkey
 Sülek, Manavgat, a village in Antalya Province, Turkey

See also